Manfred Klaus Kuschmann (25 July 1950 – 13 February 2002) was an East German long-distance runner who won two medals at the 1974 European Athletics Championships: a gold in the 10,000 metres and a silver in the 5000 metres.

He was twice a competitor at the IAAF World Cross Country Championships and twice a medallist at the European Cup.

References

1950 births
2002 deaths
East German male long-distance runners
German male long-distance runners
European Athletics Championships medalists